The Portuguese expedition to Otranto in 1481, which the Portuguese call the Turkish Crusade, arrived too late to participate in any fighting. On 8 April 1481, Pope Sixtus IV issued the papal bull Cogimur iubente altissimo, in which he called for a crusade against the Turks, who occupied Otranto in southern Italy. The Pope's intention was that, after recapturing Otranto, the crusaders would cross the Adriatic and liberate Vlorë (Valona) as well.

Portugal decided to send a squadron into Otranto under command of the bishop of Évora, Garcia de Meneses. In a letter dated 27 August 1481 to Cardinal Paolo di Campofregoso, Sixtus wrote, "From Portugal there are twenty caravels and a cargo ship that we expect on the day at St Paul's, whose leader is a venerable brother Garcia, bishop of Évora." On 7 September he wrote to King Ferdinand I of Naples, informing him that "a fleet which we sent for proceeds to Otranto from Portugal. . . We hope it will be of great use in the assault on Otranto. . ." On 14 September, the very day the Ottomans surrendered Otranto, the Pope was writing from Bracciano to his vice-chamberlain, who had informed him of the slow progress of the Portuguese fleet. Sixtus was suspicious of Garcia's intentions. The next day (15 September), he wrote to the bishop, praising him for his diligence and caution, but urging him to take his fleet to Vlorë to oust the Turkish garrison there to do "something worthy of the Christian religion and your honor and that of your king", referring to the recently deceased King Afonso V. He also urged Garcia to take Andreas Palaiologos, the deposed despot of Morea, back to Greece to begin the reconquest of his lands.

By the time the Portuguese reached Naples, the Ottomans had already withdrawn, because on May 3 the Sultan of the Ottoman Empire, Mehmed II, had died, and quarrels about his succession ensued.

Notes

Further reading

1481 in Portugal
15th-century crusades